Aphanostoma is a genus of acoel flatworms in the family Isodiametridae. Individuals can grow to 5 mm. They rely on ciliary gliding to move around. They really on ocelli for vision which are small simple eyes, found in many invertebrates, usually consisting of a few sensory cells and a single lens. They move around by ciliary gliding which is a type of locomotion in which an animal moves on a secreted layer of mucus, propelled by the beating of cilia. It is characteristic of small, soft-bodied invertebrates.

The species of this genus are found in Europe.

Species

Species:

Aphanostoma adherens 
Aphanostoma album 
Aphanostoma aurantiacum

References

Acoelomorphs